Daniel is a common surname derived from the given name Daniel. 

Notable people with the surname Daniel include:

 Allen Daniel Jr., American military officer and politician
 Antoine Daniel, Jesuit missionary
 Arnaut Daniel, Provençal troubadour of the 13th century
 Audrie Kiko Daniel, Zainichi Korean American model, actress, singer and designer
 Augustus Daniel, former Director of the National Gallery in London
 Beth Daniel, professional golfer
 Bill Daniel (filmmaker), American filmmaker
 Bill Daniel (politician), governor of Guam and Democratic member of the Texas House of Representatives 
 Britt Daniel, lead singer of the rock band Spoon
 Brittany Daniel, American actress, twin sister of Cynthia Daniel
 Caroline Daniel, panelist for The McLaughlin Group
Catherine Daniel, Dominican politician
 Celso Daniel, former mayor of Santo André, São Paulo
 Charles E. Daniel, U.S. Senator from South Carolina
 Chase Daniel, National Football League quarterback
 Christian Daniel, Puerto Rican singer-songwriter
 Cindy Daniel, French Canadian singer of Italian, Irish and Indian origin 
 Clifton Daniel, managing editor of The New York Times; husband of Margaret Truman
 Clifton Daniel, bishop in the Episcopal Church
 Clifton Truman Daniel, author and oldest grandson of former United States President Harry S. Truman
 Cynthia Daniel, American photographer, twin sister of Brittany Daniel
 Dan Daniel (sportswriter) (born Daniel Margowitz), American sportswriter
 David Daniel (disambiguation), multiple people
 Dor Daniel (born 1982), Israeli singer and songwriter
 Ed Daniel, American basketball player
 Edna Cain Daniel, American journalist and publisher
 Elijah Daniel, American comedian, rapper, and author
 Elton L. Daniel, historian and Iranologist
 Frank Daniel, Czech-born film director, producer and screenwriter
 Gabriel Daniel, French Jesuit historian
 Gbenga Daniel, governor of Ogun State in Nigeria
 Glyn Daniel, British archaeologist
 Gordon Daniel, sound editor
 Hannah Daniel (born 1986), Welsh actress
 Hugh Daniel (1962–2013), American computer engineer
 J.C. Daniel, Indian naturalist
 Jack Daniel, founder of Jack Daniel's whiskey
 James Simpson-Daniel, English rugby union footballer
 Jeffrey Daniel, American dancer and singer, notably of the group Shalamar
 Jennifer Daniel, British actress
 John Daniel (disambiguation), multiple people
 Junius Daniel, American planter and career military officer
 Lorenzo Daniel, American track and field sprinter
 Lucien Louis Daniel (1856–1940), French botanist
 Marcos Daniel, Brazilian tennis player
 Moti Daniel (born 1963), Israeli basketball player
 Oliver Daniel,  American arts administrator, musicologist, and composer
 Paul Daniel, English conductor
 Peter V. Daniel, American jurist
 Price Daniel, U.S. Senator from Texas
 Ray Daniel (1928–1997), Welsh football player and manager
 Ray Daniel (born 1962), author of Boston-based crime fiction
 Ray Daniel (born 1964), English football player
 Robert Daniel, U.S. Representative from Virginia
 Robert Mackenzie Daniel (1813–1847), Scottish novelist
 Rod Daniel (1942–2016), American television and film director
 Samuel Daniel (1562–1619), English poet, playwright, and historian
 Sean Daniel (born 1989), Israeli basketball player 
 Susan Daniel, American chemical engineer
 Taro Daniel, American-born Japanese tennis player
 Terry Daniel, American football player
 Tim Daniel, American football player
 Tony Daniel, American comic book artist
 Trevor Daniel (American football), American football player
 Wallace L. Daniel, American historian
 Wayne Daniel, cricketer
 Wendy Palmer-Daniel, professional basketball player
 W. Harrison Daniel (1922–2013), American writer
 Wiley Young Daniel (1946–2019), American judge
 William Daniel (disambiguation), multiple people
 Yuli Daniel, Soviet dissident writer
 Zoe Daniel, Australian journalist

See also
List of people named Daniel, for people with the given name

Lists of people by surname